Matteo Sobrero (born 14 May 1997) is an Italian cyclist, who currently rides for UCI WorldTeam . In October 2020, he was named in the startlist for the 2020 Giro d'Italia.

Major results

2015
 2nd Trofeo Buffoni
 3rd Trofeo Citta di Loano
2017
 4th Trofeo Città di San Vendemiano
2018
 1st Coppa della Pace
 2nd Time trial, National Under-23 Road Championships
 2nd Gran Premio Industrie del Marmo
 3rd Giro del Belvedere
 5th G.P. Palio del Recioto
 6th Trofeo Edil C
 6th Trofeo Alcide Degasperi
 9th Time trial, UCI Under-23 Road World Championships
2019
 1st  Time trial, National Under-23 Road Championships
 1st G.P. Palio del Recioto
 3rd Trofeo Laigueglia
 3rd Giro del Belvedere
2020
 5th Time trial, National Road Championships
2021
 1st  Team relay, UEC European Road Championships
 1st  Time trial, National Road Championships 
 3rd  Team relay, UCI Road World Championships
 3rd Overall Tour of Slovenia
2022
 Giro d'Italia
1st Stage 21 (ITT)
Held  after Stages 2–3
 2nd  Team relay, UCI Road World Championships
 3rd Chrono des Nations
 4th Overall Tour de Pologne
 4th Time trial, National Road Championships

Grand Tour general classification results timeline

References

External links

1997 births
Living people
Italian male cyclists
People from Alba, Piedmont
Competitors at the 2018 Mediterranean Games
Mediterranean Games competitors for Italy
Cyclists from Piedmont
Italian Giro d'Italia stage winners
Sportspeople from the Province of Cuneo